Roger Sénié (19 July 1920 – 11 September 2021) was a French politician. He served as Mayor of La Bastide-de-Bousignac from 1947 to 2014 as a member of the Rally for the Republic (RPR) and the Union for a Popular Movement (UMP). In 2014, he was the oldest mayor in France alongside .

Biography
Sénié succeeded his former schoolteacher as Mayor of La Bastide-de-Bousignac in 1947. His grandfather had served as Mayor from 1920 to 1929. In 2001, Jean Cazal, one of Sénié's municipal councilors since 1977, set up a rival coalition and put his re-election campaign in doubt. However, Sénié remained victorious, winning 65% of the vote.

In 2008, Sénié was re-elected for the 11th time. However, the election results were annulled by Toulouse administrative tribunal on 6 June 2008. The elections took place again on 20 July, resulting in a victory for Sénié with 66% of the vote. He then began a hunger strike. He was elected back into office on 21 July 2013. He did not stand for re-election in 2014.

Roger Sénié died on 11 September 2021 at the age of 101.

References

1920 births
2021 deaths
20th-century French politicians
21st-century French politicians
Rally for the Republic politicians
Union for a Popular Movement politicians
French general councillors
Mayors of places in Occitania (administrative region)
People from Ariège (department)
French centenarians
Men centenarians